Savköy is a belde (town) in Isparta Province, Turkey

Geography 
Savköy (or Sav for short)  is in the central district Isparta of Isparta Province. It lies to the east of Turkish state highway  which connects Isparta to Antalya at the Mediterranean Sea coast. The distance to Isparta is only . The population of Sav  was 3560 as of 2014.

History

Sav was always populated throughout its history. A quarter of Sav named Astepe  was probably populated back in the 19th century BC. According to Ottoman Empire documents of 1522, there were 35 houses in Sav.  In 1971 Sav was declared a seat of township.

Economy

The main economic sector of the town is vegetable and fruit farming. Köfke taşı, a construction material, is also mined around the town.

References 

Populated places in Isparta Province
Isparta Central District
Towns in Turkey